Takuma Koga is a former football player.

Takuma Koga may also refer to:

Takuma Koga (racing driver), Japanese race car driver